Fawad Hussain (born 28 August 1989) is a Pakistani first-class cricketer who played for Rawalpindi cricket team.

References

External links
 

1989 births
Living people
Pakistani cricketers
Rawalpindi cricketers
Cricketers from Rawalpindi